Gregor Duthie Duncan (born 11 October 1950) is a retired Anglican bishop of the Scottish Episcopal Church who served as the Bishop of Glasgow and Galloway from 2010 to 2018.

Early life
Duncan was born on 11 October 1950. He was educated at Allan Glen's School, a boys' state selective school in Glasgow. He went on to study at the University of Glasgow and Clare College, Cambridge. He studied for the priesthood at Ripon College Cuddesdon.

Ordained ministry
He was ordained deacon in 1983 and priest in 1984 by the Bishop of Peterborough. He began his ordained ministry as an assistant curate at Oakham. After this he was chaplain of Edinburgh Theological College followed by rector of St Columba's, Largs, then St Ninian's, Pollokshields, in Glasgow. He was Dean of Glasgow and Galloway until his appointment to the episcopate in 2010.

On 16 January 2010, he was elected Bishop of Glasgow and Galloway. He was consecrated and installed at St Mary's Cathedral in Glasgow on 23 April 2010.

Gregor Duncan suffered a stroke in January 2017.

He announced his retirement in 2018, with a valedictory Choral Evensong taking place on 7 October 2018 at St Mary’s Cathedral.

References

Sources
 
 

1950 births
Alumni of the University of Glasgow
Alumni of Clare College, Cambridge
Alumni of Ripon College Cuddesdon
Alumni of Edinburgh Theological College
Deans of Glasgow and Galloway
Bishops of Glasgow and Galloway
21st-century Scottish Episcopalian bishops
Living people